Lukovec is a small village northwest of Štanjel in the Municipality of Komen in the Littoral region of Slovenia.

References

External links
Lukovec on Geopedia

Populated places in the Municipality of Komen